Kinvara or Kinvarra is a townland in the civil parish of Kilcummin and barony of Moycullen in the west of County Galway, Ireland. It is on the R336 road north of the village of Casla and south of Screeb, at Irish Grid Reference . As of the 2011 census, the townland had a population of 54 people.

References

Townlands of County Galway